The Aw Mukhtar & Aw Sheikh Omar also known as the Twin Mosques (Somali: Masaajidka Mataanaha) is now a large mosque in the historical Hamar Weyne district in Mogadishu.

Overview 
The Twin mosques up until recently was made up of 2 separate mosques the Aw Muqtaar mosque which is rumoured to have existed around 700 years according to the elders and the Aw Sheikh Omar mosque which is a more recent established mosque and has existed for about 2 centuries prior to the 2 mosques joining. These two mosques had a feature that may be unique to the Islamic world. Where they both shared the same courtyard and the same tank for ritual ablution, but they had 2 separate imams  along with 2 prayer rooms facing each other. Where prayers would be done at the same exact time.

See also 
 Jama'a Shingani, Shingani
 Fakr ad-Din Mosque
 Arba'a Rukun Mosque
 Jama'a Xamar Weyne, Xamar Weyne
 Awooto Eeday
 Mohamed Al Tani
 Sheikh Rumani Ba 'Alawi
'Adayga

References 

Buildings and structures in Mogadishu
Mosques in Somalia